Chettithangal is a census town in Vellore district  in the state of Tamil Nadu, India.

Demographics
At the 2001 India census, Chettithangal had a population of 6,029. Males constituted 50% of the population and females 50%. Chettithangal has an average literacy rate of 70%, higher than the national average of 59.5%, with male literacy of 79% and female literacy of 60%. 10% of the population was under 6 years of age.

References

Cities and towns in Vellore district